The 2003–04 Israeli Hockey League season was the 13th season of Israel's hockey league. HC Maccabi Amos Lod won their third league title.

External links
List of Israeli champions on hockeyarenas.net

Israeli League
Israeli League (ice hockey) seasons
Seasons